The Cerithiimorpha was a suborder of marine gastropods within the Sorbeoconcha. This taxon is no longer valid according to the current taxonomy of Bouchet and Rocroi.

The previous classification system was as follows:
 subclassis = Orthogastropoda
 infraclassis = Apogastropoda
 superordo = Caenogastropoda
 ordo = Sorbeoconcha
 subordo = Cerithiimorpha

Previous taxonomy 
During the taxon's use, not all taxonomists agreed upon its structure. The listing below gives one interpretation. For example, in another accepted classification, the Campaniloidea and Cerithioidea were separated in a suborder named Discopoda.

 Campaniloidea
 Campanilidae
 Plesiotrochidae
 Cerithioidea
 Batillariidae
 Brachytremidae
 †Canterburyellidae
 Cassiopidae
 Cerithiidae
 Dialidae
 Diastomidae
 Eoptychiidae
 Eustomidae
 Faxiidae
 Lavigeriidae
 Litiopidae
 †Maoraxidae
 Melanopsidae
 Modulidae
 Pachychilidae
 Pachymelaniidae
 Pareoridae
 Pianaridae
 Planaxidae
 Potamididae
 Procerithiidae
 Pseudamaurinidae
 Scaliolidae
 Siliquariidae
 Syrnolopsidae
 Tenagodidae
 Terebrellidae - not a valid name
 Thiaridae
 Turritellidae
 Turritellopsidae
 Spationematoidea
 Spanionematidae
 Stephanozygidae

(Extinct taxa indicated by a dagger, †.)

References

Obsolete gastropod taxa
Sorbeoconcha
Marine gastropods